Les Petites du quai aux fleurs is a French film.

Plot
A bookshop owner has four daughters who have romantic troubles.

References

External links
Les Petites du quai aux fleurs at louisjourdan.net
Les Petites du quai aux fleurs at IMDb

1944 films
Films directed by Marc Allégret
French black-and-white films
Films scored by Jacques Ibert
Films with screenplays by Jean Aurenche
French romantic comedy-drama films
1940s romantic comedy-drama films
1944 comedy films
1944 drama films
1940s French-language films
1940s French films